Ralph Shipley Williams (2 October 1905 – 1 March 1985) was a Welsh professional footballer who played as a centre forward in the Football League for a number of clubs, most notably Chesterfield and Cardiff City.

Career statistics

References

People from Aberaman
Sportspeople from Rhondda Cynon Taf
Welsh footballers
Association football forwards
Aberdare Athletic F.C. players
Brentford F.C. players
English Football League players
1905 births
Aberaman Athletic F.C. players
Poole Town F.C. players
Chesterfield F.C. players
Manchester Central F.C. players
Colwyn Bay F.C. players
Cardiff City F.C. players
Crewe Alexandra F.C. players
Southport F.C. players
Rochdale A.F.C. players
Southern Football League players
1985 deaths
Merthyr Town F.C. players
Lovell's Athletic F.C. players
Aberdare Town F.C. players
Bangor City F.C. players
Rhyl F.C. players